James William Stevens (born 27 March 1983) is the Liberal Party member of the Australian House of Representatives for the Division of Sturt in South Australia. He was elected in the 2019 Australian federal election, replacing the retiring Liberal member, Christopher Pyne. Stevens previously served as the Chief of Staff to Steven Marshall, the Premier of South Australia, and prior to that as the General Manager of Michell Australia.

Early life and education
James Stevens was born on 27 March 1983 in Rose Park, South Australia.

Stevens attended Canberra Grammar School before completing school at St Peters College, Adelaide. He gained a Bachelor of Commerce and Master of International Trade and Development at the University of Adelaide.

Career before politics
Stevens worked for Michell Wool, including as Commercial Manager and General Manager.

Political life
From July 2004 to July 2006 Stevens served as President of the South Australian Young Liberal Movement. In 2005 he ran for the position of Federal Young Liberal President but was defeated by Alex Hawke.

Stevens was elected Campaign Coordinator for the South Australian Liberal Party in August 2006, serving in the role for two years.

Stevens had worked for Christopher Pyne, and became chief of staff to Steven Marshall in February 2013 upon Marshall being elected the new Leader of the Opposition in state government. He had previously been campaign manager for Marshall's successful entry into state politics in the 2010 election, defeating Labor incumbent Vini Ciccarello in the seat of Norwood.

Stevens also served as the president of the Liberal Party in the Dunstan State Electorate Council from 2012 to 2016 and Sturt Federal Electorate Council from 2016 to 2019.

From 2013 to 2018, Stevens served as the chief of staff to the leader of the parliamentary Liberal Party of South Australia.

Steven was appointed the chief of staff to the South Australian Premier Steven Marshall from 2018 to 2019.  He oversaw the adoption by the party of data mining software in the lead-up to the 2018 South Australian state election.

Stevens was elected to the House of Representatives for Sturt in South Australia in 2019, replacing Christopher Pyne, who announced in March 2019 that he would retire from politics.

Stevens is a member of the Moderate faction of the Liberal Party.

In 2022, Stevens fell asleep in his office and failed to turn up to vote on the Religious Discrimination Bill. He denied claims that he had soiled himself as something that "patently did not happen".

At the 2022 Federal Election, Stevens suffered a swing of 7.4% against him. He managed to retain the seat by a slim margin of 0.5%.

Recognition
In June 2013, The Advertiser newspaper listed Stevens as one of the 50 Most Influential South Australians.

Personal life
Stevens is dating Alex May, the current State Director of the Liberal Party in South Australia and former Deputy Chief of Staff to Premier Steven Marshall.

References

External links

 

Living people
1983 births
University of Adelaide alumni
People educated at Canberra Grammar School
People educated at St Peter's College, Adelaide
Liberal Party of Australia politicians
Members of the Australian House of Representatives
Members of the Australian House of Representatives for Sturt
University of South Australia alumni
21st-century Australian politicians